Ba Than may refer to:

 Ba Than (historian) (1870s–c. 1931), writer, poet and historian
 Ba Than (surgeon) (1895–1971), Burmese surgeon and professor
 Saung Ba Than (1908–1987), singer and Burmese harpist, trainer of May Sweet
 Dhammika Ba Than (1914–1987), Burmese writer and army colonel, alumnus of St. Paul's High School